Circulation: Cardiovascular Imaging is a scientific journal published by Lippincott Williams & Wilkins for the American Heart Association. The journals presents articles focusing on clinical trials and observational studies, with a focus on innovative imaging approaches to diagnosis cardiovascular disease.

See also
 Circulation
 Circulation: Cardiovascular Interventions
 Journal of the American College of Cardiology
 European Heart Journal

References

External links 

Cardiology journals
Lippincott Williams & Wilkins academic journals
American Heart Association academic journals